Viliame Takayawa (born 21 February 1949) is a Fijian judoka. He competed at the 1984 Summer Olympics and the 1988 Summer Olympics.

References

External links

1949 births
Living people
Fijian male judoka
Olympic judoka of Fiji
Judoka at the 1984 Summer Olympics
Judoka at the 1988 Summer Olympics